The Suites, New York 1968 & 1970 is volume five of The Private Collection, a series of compilation albums by Duke Ellington from his archive of unreleased music. The album includes "The Degas Suite", an unreleased soundtrack for an unfinished film consisting of paintings of horse races.

Also included is "The River", which was composed to accompany a ballet by Alvin Ailey that premiered on June 25, 1970, at New York State Theater in Lincoln Center.

Reception
The AllMusic review by Scott Yanow stated: "Ellington is mostly the lead voice but his star sidemen are heard from on these formerly very rare and somewhat unusual performances. Clearly his genius was strong enough to fill three lifetimes full of new music and this CD contains some melodies that might have been more significant if he had lived long enough to find a place for them."

Track listing

Recorded at National Recording Studio, New York on November 6, 1968 (tracks 1.1-1.11), November 23, 1968 (track 1.1), December 3, 1968 (track 1.7), at Universal Studios, Chicago on May 25, 1970 (tracks 2.1-2.5 & 2.12), at National Recording Studio, New York on June 3, 1970 (tracks 2.7-2.10), June 8, 1970 (track 2.6) and June 15, 1970 (track 2.11).

Personnel
 Duke Ellington – piano
 Cat Anderson  – trumpet
 Dave Burns  – trumpet
 Willie Cook – trumpet
 Mercer Ellington – trumpet
 Money Johnson – trumpet
 Frank Stone – trumpet
 Cootie Williams – trumpet
 Lawrence Brown – trombone
 Buster Cooper  – trombone
 Cliff Heathers – trombone
 Chuck Connors – bass trombone
 Johnny Hodges – alto saxophone
 Russell Procope – alto saxophone, clarinet
 Norris Turney – alto saxophone, flute
 Harold Ashby – tenor saxophone
 Paul Gonsalves – tenor saxophone
 Harry Carney – baritone saxophone
 Jeff Castleman – double bass
 Joe Benjamin – drums
 Rufus "Speedy" Jones – drums
 Elayne Jones – tympani
 Walter Rosenberg – glockenspiel
 Dave Fitz – xylophone, marimba

References

Saja Records albums
Duke Ellington albums
1987 albums